Begonia pavonina, or peacock begonia, is a species of rhizomatous plant in the family Begoniaceae. It is endemic to the dim understory in the montane forests of  peninsular Malaysia.

References

External links
 

Flora of Peninsular Malaysia
pavonina